Gerald Pressley Matheson (27 August 1904 – 13 April 1964) was an Australian rules footballer who played with Footscray in the Victorian Football League (VFL).

He later served in the Australian Army for five years during World War II.

Notes

External links 

1904 births
1964 deaths
Australian rules footballers from Victoria (Australia)
Western Bulldogs players